Ukko Hietala (4 August 1904 – 31 October 1990) was a Finnish modern pentathlete. He competed at the 1936 Summer Olympics.

References

External links
 

1904 births
1990 deaths
People from Hollola
People from Häme Province (Grand Duchy of Finland)
Finnish male modern pentathletes
Olympic modern pentathletes of Finland
Modern pentathletes at the 1936 Summer Olympics
Sportspeople from Päijät-Häme